Civil Twilight was a four-piece rock band from Cape Town, South Africa, consisting of the brothers Andrew and Steven McKellar plus Richard Wouters and Kevin Dailey. They are signed to Wind-up Records, and have released three studio albums – their self-titled debut album, Civil Twilight (2009), Holy Weather (2012), and Story of an Immigrant on 10 July 2015.

Origin 
Originally hailing from Cape Town, Civil Twilight started as a trio that drew parallels with The Police and very early U2, Muse, Jeff Buckley, and Radiohead. Their music has been described as having impassioned vocals and classic song craft. Brothers Andrew and Steven McKellar were raised in a musical household, having explored their father's jazz collection at a young age while listening to their classically trained mother play piano. In November 1996, Andrew launched a teenaged band with help from his high school classmate, drummer Richard Wouters, who was just starting out in music. The two scheduled an inaugural rehearsal for the following month; in the interim, Andrew discovered that his younger brother, Steven, could sing and write songs. The three musicians subsequently banded together, with Steven agreeing to learn the bass.

Career 
Civil Twilight spent several years practicing in local church halls and garages before graduating to the local club scene, where they steadily became a well-respected act. Having finished their education, the bandmates then relocated to Los Angeles in August 2005; shortly thereafter, they signed with the indie label One October and co-produced their debut record, Human. The album arrived in 2007 and received an extra boost when several songs were featured in prime-time television shows, including One Tree Hill, House, Star-Crossed and Terminator: The Sarah Connor Chronicles. As their profile mounted, the musicians relocated to Nashville.

Their musical influences, interests, and heroes range from Oasis to Wilco, The National to Grizzly Bear.

In 2012, they headlined a US tour (with Morning Parade opening up), supported two months with Mutemath, and various dates with Young the Giant.
Past tour mates have also included Florence + the Machine, Smashing Pumpkins, Anberlin, Neon Trees, Jimmy Eat World, Silversun Pickups, and Of Monsters and Men.

Civil Twilight played the Main stages of 2012 festivals such as Austin City Limits, Bumbershoot (their 2nd visit), Milwaukee Summerfest (their third visit), and Music Midtown
2011 also saw them play most every major festival in the US, including but not limited to, Bonnaroo, Voodoo, Hangout, Mountain Jam, 80–35, Vh1's Best Cruise Ever, Rivers Edge, and a headline performance at the Rockin' the Daisies festival in Cape Town, South Africa.

Civil Twilight's debut single in 2010, "Letters from the Sky", reached #5 on the Alternative radio charts and remained in the Top 10 for 6 months of the year, with over 1,000 spins throughout Texas, and from Philadelphia to Seattle, selling over 200,000 copies.

Their last single "Fire Escape" charted Top 20 Alternative, and received extensive coverage on Vh1, Fuse and MTV.

Their songs have been featured in many TV spots, including One Tree Hill and Terminator: The Sarah Connor Chronicles. "Quiet in My Town" was prominently featured at the end of season 6, episode 3 Get Cape. Wear Cape. Fly. of One Tree Hill on The CW Network. It played for 6 minutes during the coda – the scene of Quentin's funeral. They have also had songs on Vampire Diaries and the movie, Underworld: Awakening.

"Letters from the Sky" was featured at the end of Episode 11 of Harper's Island. In addition to this, the song was also featured on season 7 of One Tree Hill, in the opening scene of the episode You Are a Runner and I Am My Father's Son. The song has also featured at the end of the film I Am Number Four left behind 2014. It was also featured in Shameless season 8 episode 7 as Lip pays a visit to Professor Youens in his new living situation. "Letters from the Sky" also featured prominently in the 10th episode of series 7 of The Mentalist. "Letters from the Sky" was also used by World Wrestling Entertainment for the promo video between Dwayne "The Rock" Johnson and John Cena for their Championship match at WrestleMania 29. "Letters from the Sky" was the iTunes Free Download of the Week for the week of 6–12 October 2009.

The band's self-titled album was originally released independently in 2008. Having now signed to Wind-up Records, this album was due to be re-released 31 March 2009; however, due to scheduling issues it was pushed back. It was eventually released 21 July 2009.

Civil Twilight's album Holy Weather came out 26 March 2012. Kevin Dailey from Charlotte, North Carolina, also joined the band around this time.

On 2 March 2015, the band released a new song, titled "Story of an Immigrant", and announced their new album of the same name. In a statement, the band has this to say about the new track: "This song both lyrically and musically seemed to set the course for the new music we were writing. It was the first song written for the new record where we all collectively went, 'I like this. Let's keep going in this direction.' We think musically it very naturally links our past with where we're headed—and lyrically it's in many ways the story of our lives, our band, and our journey". The album was released on 10 July 2015.

In October 2017, at the Linkin Park and Friends: Celebrate Life in Honor of Chester Bennington tribute concert, Linkin Park's Mike Shinoda spoke about how Talinda, Chester Bennington's widow, had described that Bennington was a fan of Steve McKellar's voice, so McKellar was invited to join the tribute concert, performing vocals on "Nobody Can Save Me" and "Waiting for the End".

Members 
 Steven McKellar – bass, lead vocals, keyboards, piano
 Andrew McKellar – guitar, violin bow, backing vocals
 Richard Wouters – drums, percussion
 Kevin Dailey – keyboards, guitar, backing vocals

Discography

Studio albums

Extended plays 
 iTunes Live from SoHo, 2010
 Holy Weather Remix EP, 2012

Singles

TV and film appearances

References

External links 
Official website
Civil Twilight on MySpace

Wind-up Records artists
South African alternative rock groups
South African indie rock groups
Musical groups established in 1996